PEBL may refer to:

Electronics
 Motorola Pebl a former model of cellular phone

Software
 PEBL (software) a programming language